The Richard Vaughen Morris House is a historic house located at 314 Quince Street in Salt Lake City, Utah, was built in the 1860s, definitely by 1866. It was listed on the National Register of Historic Places in 1980.

It is important as an early vernacular, adobe home updated with Federal/Georgian stylings later. It was home of Richard Vaughen Morris, a businessman and government official.

References

Houses on the National Register of Historic Places in Utah
Georgian architecture in Utah
Federal architecture in Utah
Houses completed in 1860
Houses in Salt Lake City
National Register of Historic Places in Salt Lake City